The 2000 Copa Merconorte was an association football tournament held in 2000. Atlético Nacional of Colombia beat another Colombian club, Millonarios, in the final.

Group stage

Each team played the other teams in the group twice during the group stage. The first placed team advanced to the second round.

Group A

Group B

Group C

Group D

Semifinals

First Leg

Second Leg

Finals

First Leg

Second Leg

Champion

External links
 2000 Copa Merconorte game summaries
 2000 Copa Merconorte stats

Copa Merconorte
3
Mer